Diane Lacombe (born 4 June 1976) is a French former backstroke swimmer who competed in the 1992 Summer Olympics.

References

1976 births
Living people
French female backstroke swimmers
French female freestyle swimmers
Olympic swimmers of France
Swimmers at the 1992 Summer Olympics